Beijing Capital International Airport Co., Ltd. (BCIA), majority owned by Capital Airport Holding, is engaged in the ownership and operation of the Beijing Capital International Airport in Beijing, China and the provision of related services.

The company provides aircraft and passenger facilities, ground support services and fire-fighting services for airlines. It is also in charge of franchising ground handling agent services, in-flight catering services, retail shop operations, food and beverage businesses, and leasing of advertising spaces inside and outside the terminals.

The company's H shares was listed on the Hong Kong Stock Exchange on 1 February 2000. It plans to issue A shares on the Shanghai Stock Exchange in near future.

Li Peiying, a former head official of the company from 1995 to 2003, was found guilty in February 2009 of accepting $4 million in bribes and stealing a further $12 million in public funds. Li was executed on August 7, 2009 in Jinan after the Supreme People's Court upheld a lower court's rejection of his appeal.

Due to capacity constraints, BCIA is involved in feasibility studies for a second major airport to the south of Beijing. China's National Development and Reform Commission (NDRC), the Civil Aviation Administration of China (CAAC), and the Beijing municipal government are also involved in the feasibility studies. This second airport is expected to be built in Daxing. Construction of the second Beijing airport begun in 2014, and was completed on 30 June 2019, followed by the official opening on 26 September 2019.

See also
 Beijing Capital International Airport
 Beijing Daxing International Airport

External links
 
 Beijing Capital International Airport Company Limited

References

Airport operators of China
Companies based in Beijing
Government-owned companies of China
Companies listed on the Hong Kong Stock Exchange
Chinese companies established in 1999
H shares